Varlamov Glacier is a glacier on Beethoven Peninsula, Alexander Island, flowing northwest into the head of  Brahms Inlet. It was named by the USSR Academy of Sciences in 1987 after Alexander Egorovich Varlamov (1801-48), the Russian composer.

References

Glaciers of Alexander Island